The Embalmer may refer to:
 The Embalmer (manga), a manga series written and illustrated by Mitsukazu Mihara
 The Embalmer (1965 film) or Il mostro di Venezia, a 1965 giallo film directed by Dino Tavella
 The Embalmer (1996 film), a 1996 film directed by S. Torriano Berry
 The Embalmer (2002 film) or L'imbalsamatore, a 2002 film directed by Matteo Garrone
 The Embalmer (character), named Aesop Carl, in the game Identity V by NetEase company.

See also
 Embalming
 Embalmer (band)